Dr Rock may refer to:

People 
 Daniel Rock (1799–1871), English Roman Catholic priest, ecciesiologist and antiquarian
 John Rock (scientist) (1890–1984), American obstetrician and developer of the first birth control pill
 Richard Rock (1690?–1777), well-known English doctor depicted by Hogarth
 Charles White (Dr Rock) (born 1942), Irish-born BBC Radio and TV presenter

Other uses 
 "Doctor Rock", a 1986 song by Motörhead from Orgasmatron
 "Dr. Rock", a 1991 song by Ween from The Pod
 Doctor Rock is a character in the movie Salvador